Kampong Jangsak is a village in Brunei-Muara District, Brunei, on the outskirts of the capital Bandar Seri Begawan. The population was 2,968 in 2016. It is one of the villages within Mukim Kilanas. The postcode is BF2720.

Facilities 
The village mosque is Sultan Haji Hassanal Bolkiah Silver Jubilee Mosque; it was opened on 29 April 1999 and can accommodate 1,200 worshippers.

References 

Jangsak